Sedalia Regional Airport  is two miles east of Sedalia, in Pettis County, Missouri. It was formerly Sedalia Memorial Airport. The National Plan of Integrated Airport Systems for 2011–2015 categorized it as a general aviation facility.

Facilities
Sedalia Regional Airport covers 507 acres (205 ha) at an elevation of 910 feet (277 m). It has two runways: 18/36 is 5,500 by 100 feet (1,676 x 30 m) concrete; 5/23 is 3,519 by 50 feet (1,073 x 15 m) asphalt.

In the year ending September 30, 2009 the airport had 9,692 aircraft operations, average 26 per day: 65% general aviation, 25% air taxi, and 10% military. 18 aircraft were then based at the airport: 72% single-engine, 17% multi-engine, 6% jet, and 6% helicopter.

Trivia
 The biggest plane ever to land at Sedalia was Bill Cosby's plane when he performed at the Missouri State Fair.
 The second biggest plane ever to land at Sedalia was Hank Williams, Jr.'s plane when he performed at the Missouri State Fair.

References

External links 
 Sedalia Regional Airport at City of Sedalia website
  at Missouri DOT airport directory
 Aerial image as of March 1997 from USGS The National Map
 

Airports in Missouri
Buildings and structures in Pettis County, Missouri